Joji Takeuchi (竹内 譲次、born January 29, 1985 in Suita, Osaka, Japan) is a Japanese professional basketball player. He plays for the Alvark Tokyo of the B.League.
Takeuchi also is a member of the Japan national basketball team, playing for the team in the 2006 FIBA World Championship and both the FIBA Asia Championship 2007 and FIBA Asia Championship 2009.  Takeuchi's twin brother Kosuke is also a member of the Japanese national basketball team.

As a 21-year-old, Takeuchi averaged 6.2 points and 5.2 rebounds per game for the host Japanese at the 2006 FIBA World Championship.  Takeuchi has earned a bigger role with the Japanese team over the past four years; his best tournament performance to date was at the FIBA Asia Championship 2009, in which he averaged 9.8 points and 7.2 rebounds per game.  Despite his performance, Japan stumbled to a disappointing tenth-place finish, its worst ever performance in 24 FIBA Asia Championship appearances.

Takeuchi played professionally with the Hitachi SunRockers of the JBL Super League.  In the 2009-10 season, Takeuchi entered the month-long winter break averaging 16.1 points and 9.4 rebounds per game for the third-place Seahorses.  He was also named to the JBL All-Star Game as the leading power forward vote-getter for the East.

Career statistics 

|-
| align="left" |  2013-14
| align="left" | Hitachi
| 36|| || 29.3|| .513|| .182|| .667|| 9.3|| 2.2|| 0.7|| 1.0|| 1.7|| 12.3
|-
| align="left" | 2014-15
| align="left" | Hitachi
| 53|| || 28.1|| .557|| .250|| .758|| 8.2|| 2.0|| 0.9|| 0.7|| 1.6|| 12.5
|-
| align="left" | 2015-16
| align="left" | Hitachi
| 51|| || 30.5|| .496|| .237|| .716|| 7.8|| 1.9|| 1.0|| 1.2|| 1.5|| 12.3 
|-
| align="left" | 2016-17
| align="left" | A Tokyo
| || || || || || || || || || || ||
|-
|}

References

1985 births
Living people
Tokai University alumni
Alvark Tokyo players
Asian Games bronze medalists for Japan
Asian Games medalists in basketball
Basketball players at the 2006 Asian Games
Basketball players at the 2010 Asian Games
Basketball players at the 2014 Asian Games
Japanese men's basketball players
Medalists at the 2014 Asian Games
People from Suita
Power forwards (basketball)
Sportspeople from Osaka Prefecture
Sun Rockers Shibuya players
2006 FIBA World Championship players
2019 FIBA Basketball World Cup players
Twin sportspeople
Japanese twins